Castelnau-d'Estrétefonds is a commune in the Haute-Garonne department in southwestern France.  It is served by Castelnau-d'Estrétefonds station on the Bordeaux-Toulouse line.

Population

See also
Communes of the Haute-Garonne department

References

Communes of Haute-Garonne